Ajamu X (born 1963 in Huddersfield) is a British artist, curator, archivist and activist. He is best known for his fine art photography which explores same-sex desire, and the Black male body, and his work as an archivist and activist to document the lives and experiences of black LGBTQ people in the United Kingdom (UK).

Early life
Ajamu was born in 1963 in Huddersfield to Jamaican parents. His grandparents arrived to England in 1958 and his parents followed in 1962.

Ajamu came out as gay to his parents in his late teens and describes their reaction as "impressively progressive for the times". He studied Black History and photography in Leeds. While in Leeds, he and two friends created the magazine BLAC, an acronym for Black Liberation Activist Core. In October 1987, after seeing it advertised in the newspaper Caribbean Times, Ajamu attended the first, and only, National Black Gay Men's Conference held at the Black Lesbian and Gay Centre in Camden. By January the following year, he had moved to London.
He was given the name Ajamu in 1991; it means "he who fights for what he believes".

Career 
Ajamu's work often highlights stories of black LGBT people who he feels are often marginalised from mainstream British Society; additionally he has chosen to focus on those who are black and openly "out" and have been accepted by their families.  Ajamu has said he rejects the claim that Jamaican culture is particularly homophobic and believes that homophobia exists across cultures and families of all backgrounds.

He often speaks of his work as a "sex activist"; he has run "sex parties for men who want to have sex with men" since the 1990s, and same-sex desire and pleasure are recurring themes in his photography. His first major exhibition Black Bodyscapes, in 1994, focused on the private sexual realities of black gay men. More recent projects include Fierce: Portraits of Young Black Queers. an exhibition of 24 portraits of a "…new generation of Black and proudly out young, emerging and established talent" at London's Guildhall Art Gallery in 2014 and I Am For You Can Enjoy with Khalil West, at Contact Theatre, Manchester, in 2016, which uses photography and video, to explore the lives of queer Black male sex workers and their clients. Ajamu has described himself as an "artist who has created an archive" and, in addition to his art practice, continues to document black LGBT experiences.

In 2000 Ajamu and Topher Campbell co-founded rukus! Federation an "arts company dedicated to celebrating and showcasing the best in challenging, provocative works by black lesbian, gay, bisexual and trans-gender artists nationally and internationally." Ajamu was the Archive Manager "The Black LGBT Archive Project", a major initiative to develop an archive collection on "Black Lesbian, Gay, Bisexual and Trans-Gender heritage, history and lived experience in the UK". In 2008 Ajamu co-curated the exhibition Outside Edge: a journey through Black lesbian and gay history at the Museum of Docklands. The rukus! Black Lesbian Gay Bisexual Transgender Cultural Archive was deposited at London Metropolitan Archives in 2010.

Ajamu was the subject of Topher Campbell's first film The Homecoming: A Short Film about Ajamu in 1995. The documentary film Brixton Recreation with Ajamu, directed by Danny Solle, featured his experiences of cruising and sex as an out Black gay man in Brixton.

His fine art photography is in national and international collections including the Gallery of Modern Art in Glasgow, Autograph ABP, and the Neuberger Museum of Art in New York. Ajamu is co-chair of Centred, an LGBTQ community organisation, in London's Soho.

Selected exhibitions
 2019 Diasporic Self – Black Togetherness as Lingua Franca, Framer Framed, Amsterdam (14 dec – 17 feb 2019)
 2016 Khalil West and Ajamu - I Am For You Can Enjoy, Contact Theatre, Manchester (4 February - 18 June 2016)
 2013 Fierce - Portraits of Young Black LGBTQ people by Ajamu, Guildhall Art Gallery, London 
 2012 Future Histories, Street Level Photoworks, Glasgow
 2011 Queer Self Portraits Now, Fred, London
 2010 Photoshow, Leslie-Lohman Museum of Gay and Lesbian Art, New York
 2009 Familiar Strangers, Gallery of Modern Art, Glasgow
 2004 Hidden Histories, Walsall New Art Gallery, England
 1997 Transforming the Crown, Caribbean Cultural Centre, New York.
 1994 Black Bodyscapes, Camerawork, London
 1992 From Where I Stand, Brixton Art Gallery, London

As Curator:
 2016 Curatorial Resident, Visual AIDS, New York 
 2008 Outside Edge: a journey through black British lesbian and gay history, Museum of Docklands, London

References

Further reading
 Bailey, David A., ed. (1995) Ajamu: Black Bodyscapes, Camerawork, London.
 Njami, Simon. (1994) Anthology of African Photography, Edition Revue Noir 
 X, Ajamu, Campbell, Topher, & Stevens, Mary (2010). Love and lubrication in the archives, or rukus!: a Black queer archive for the United Kingdom. Archivaria, 68(68)

External links
 
 rukus! Federation official website
 rukus! Black Lesbian Gay Bisexual Transgender Cultural Archive at London Metropolitan Archives
 rukus! Black Lesbian Gay Bisexual Transgender Cultural Archive finding aid AIM25

Archivists
1963 births
Living people
Black British artists
Black British photographers
British activists
British curators
Gay photographers
British gay artists
LGBT Black British people
LGBT history in the United Kingdom
People from Huddersfield
Photographers from Yorkshire
21st-century English LGBT people
British LGBT photographers